Slepšek is a small settlement west of Mokronog in the Municipality of Mokronog-Trebelno in southeastern Slovenia. The area is part of the historical region of Lower Carniola. The municipality is now included in the Southeast Slovenia Statistical Region. 

The local church is dedicated to Martin of Tours and belongs to the Parish of Mokronog. It has a Romanesque nave with a 16th-century extension. The building was restyled in the Baroque in the mid-18th century.

References

External links

Slepšek on Geopedia

Populated places in the Municipality of Mokronog-Trebelno